Qai Qai is a doll belonging to Alexis Olympia Ohanian, the daughter of American professional tennis player and winner of 23 Grand Slam titles, Serena Williams, and co-founder of Reddit and Initialized Capital, Alexis Ohanian Sr. The doll became popular on social media in 2018, with many pictures of her face digitized and animated to have various expressions.

Background
Alexis Ohanian and Serena Williams' daughter, Olympia, was born on September 1, 2017, in West Palm Beach, Florida. When Williams bought the doll for Olympia, she indicated that she wanted her daughter's first doll to be black because growing up, she did not have many opportunities to own a black doll. Qai Qai got her name from Williams's nephew.

Social media presence
Qai Qai's first post on her own Instagram was on August 22, 2018, where she is lying on the floor.  She also joined Twitter that month, although the account has not been officially verified.

Popularity and fandom has increased for Qai Qai.  While likely run by Olympia's parents, Serena Williams and Alexis Ohanian, it is unknown who administers the doll's account.  On September 23, in Alexis Ohanian's Instagram post, he did a shoutout to Invisible Universe for helping QaiQai pursue her dreams.  Invisible Universe is "an entertainment technology company behind the most popular, celebrity-backed animated characters on social media including Squeaky & Roy (D'Amelio Family), Qai Qai (Serena Williams), Kayda & Kai (Karlie Kloss), and Crazynho (Dani Alves)."
Some images show Qai Qai being neglected. This spurred public concern where social media fans used the hashtag #QQPS (Qai Qai Protective Services).

Qai Qai has been featured in several USA Today articles, Today and Oprah magazine, the last of which she did an exclusive interview.

On August 29, 2019, Alexis Ohanian Sr. wore a shirt with Qai Qai's likeness to the 2019 US Open match with Serena Williams vs. Caty McNally. This same shirt was worn by Ohanian Sr. in an Instagram post on December 14, 2018.  Another Qai Qai shirt was featured on Ohanian Sr.'s Instagram post. This selfie shirt was part of a limited run fundraiser for the non-profit organization Zoe’s Dolls, which was founded by an eleven year old with the mission of giving brown dolls away to brown kids.

On December 2, 2019, @realqaiqai announced on Twitter that additional merchandise is available for Cyber Monday 2019 with a portion of proceeds going to Zoe's Dolls.

On January 16, 2019, Tennis.com featured an article showing Qai Qai's social media presence 

On September 23, 2021, Alexis Ohanian was interviewed by PEOPLE, discussing Qai Qai and a new digital coloring book that has different careers the doll and her friends can take on including: fashion designer, film editor, game developer, structural engineer and small business owner.

Digitalization

Qai Qai is portrayed as a physical doll and has a digitized version with a full personality. Qai Qai appears animated facial expressions digitally created and inserted into photographs and has over 3.1 million followers on TikTok.

Mass production
As of October 2020, Qai Qai dolls were being sold by Amazon.

See also
Baby Nancy

References

External links
 

Celebrity dolls
American Internet celebrities